Electribe is a group of electronic musical instruments by Korg. From its beginnings with the Electribe R to the ESX-1, this series includes both analogue modeling synthesizers and sampling drum machines that can be programmed the same as a drum machine. The analogue modeling synth and sampling drum machine both share a drum-pattern section and a synth-pattern section, whereby the user can not only program drum patterns, but also synth and basslines. These hybrid machines could be considered 'grooveboxes'.

The launch party for the product in 1999 was announced with a recorded CD invitation that was featured in Entertainment Weekly magazine as one of the best party invitations of the year.

Models 
 
1st generation - Released 1999-2000
 EA-1: Analog Modeling Synthesizer 
 ER-1: Rhythm Synthesizer
 ES-1: Rhythm Production Sampler
 EM-1: Music Production Station

 

2nd generation - Released 2003-4
 EA-1 mkII: Analog Modeling Synthesizer
 ER-1 mkII: Rhythm Synthesizer
 ES-1 mkII: Rhythm Production Sampler (using SmartMedia storage. Maximum size card recognized is 64MB)
 ESX-1: Music Production Sampler (using SmartMedia storage)
 EMX-1: Music Production Station (using SmartMedia storage)

3rd generation - Released 2010
 ESX-1SD: Music Production Sampler (Identical to the ESX-1, but using Secure Digital (SD) storage)
 EMX-1SD: Music Production Station (Identical to the EMX-1, but using Secure Digital (SD) storage)

iPad application
 iElectribe: an app for the iPad
 iElectribe: an app for the iPhone
Electribe Wave: an app for the iPad and iPhone

4th generation - Announced Sept 2014
 electribe: Music Production Station (using SD Card storage) http://www.korg.com/us/products/dj/electribe/
 electribe sampler: Music Production Sampler (using SD Card storage) http://www.korg.com/us/products/dj/electribe_sampler/
 Electribe ER1 VST, as part of the Korg Collection released in November 2022.

References

Further reading

External links 
 Korg home page
 Korg Electribe forum
 Electribe ESX/EMX forum
 Electribrary files community database

Korg synthesizers
Grooveboxes